Paraphungia laosensis is a species of beetle in the family Mordellidae, the only species in the genus Paraphungia. It is known from Laos.

References

Mordellidae
Beetles described in 1969